Oei Wie Gwan, a native of Lasem, Central Java, was a Chinese-Indonesian businessman who founded the kretek company PT Djarum. The company was established on 21 April 1951 on Bitingan Kudus Street with of 10 employees. The small-time venture soon took off.

In the mid-1950s, Oei Wie Gwan purchased the brand and licence to the name. The word "Djarum" refers to a gramophone needle.

His first business venture was the establishment of a fireworks factory under the brand Leo, located in Rembang, Central Java. Leo became a leading fireworks brand in Indonesia. The factory, established pre-World War II, stopped production after the nation gained independence, due to a government ban which resulted in the closure of fireworks factories in Indonesia.

Kretek became Oei Wie Gwan's business of choice following the closure of his fireworks business. Under the PT Djarum brand, tobacco and cloves, were blended in cigarettes.

He died in 1963. He left his sons Michael Bambang Hartono and Robert Budi Hartono in charge of the company.

1963 deaths
Indonesian company founders
Indonesian people of Chinese descent
Year of birth missing
People from Fuqing
Hartono family